Scoparia matsuii is a moth in the family Crambidae. It was described by Inoue in 1994. It is found in Japan.

References

Moths described in 1994
Scorparia